This article is a list of Hiatari Ryōkō! episodes, an anime television series based on a manga series of the same title by Mitsuru Adachi.  The TV series began airing in Japan on 22 March 1987 on the Fuji TV Network in Japan. The series ran for one year, with episode 48 airing on 20 March 1988.

Summary of series
Each TV episode is about 25 minutes long.

Sources:

References

Hiatari Ryoko!

ja:陽あたり良好!#テレビアニメ